Jean-Claude Piumi (27 May 1940 – 24 March 1996) was a French former football defender.

External links
 

1940 births
1996 deaths
French footballers
France international footballers
Association football defenders
Valenciennes FC players
AS Monaco FC players
1966 FIFA World Cup players
Ligue 1 players